RNC Media (formerly Radio-Nord Communications) is a Canadian broadcasting group based in Westmount, Quebec, with offices in Gatineau and Rouyn-Noranda. The company operates five television stations and several radio stations, mostly in Quebec.

The company was founded in 1948 when brothers Jean-Joffre and David Armand Gourd, along with business partner Roger Charbonneau, acquired radio stations CKRN Rouyn (now CHOA-FM), CHAD Amos (defunct) and CKVD Val-d'Or (now CHGO-FM) from Canadian media mogul Roy Thomson.

Television

Terrestrial
 Gatineau/Ottawa - CHOT-DT (TVA), CFGS-DT (Noovo)
 Rouyn-Noranda - CFEM-DT (TVA)
 Val-d'Or/Rouyn-Noranda - CFVS-DT (Noovo)

Radio
The primary brands associated with the company are Radio X, BPM Sports, and WOW-FM. BPM Sports outlets in Gatineau and Quebec City carry music programming during evening hours, due to CRTC-imposed programming restrictions.

 Gatineau: CFTX-FM (BPM Sports), CHLX-FM (WOW-FM)
 Montreal: CKLX-FM (BPM Sports)
 Quebec City: CHOI-FM (Radio X), CHXX-FM (BPM Sports)

References

External links
 RNC Media website
 CRTC chart of RNC Media's assets
 History of Radio Nord (RNC Media Inc.) - Canadian Communications Foundation

 
Television broadcasting companies of Canada
Companies based in Quebec
Westmount, Quebec
Mass media companies established in 1948
1948 establishments in Quebec